The 2005 Generali Ladies Linz is the 2005 Tier II WTA Tour tournament of the annually-held Generali Ladies Linz tennis tournament. It was the 20th edition of the tournament and was held from October 22–30, 2005 at the TipsArena Linz. Nadia Petrova won the singles title.

Points and prize money

Point distribution

Prize money

* per team

Singles main draw entrants

Seeds 

Rankings are as of 17 October 2005.

Other entrants 
The following players received wildcards into the singles main draw:
  Sybille Bammer
  Lisa Raymond

The following players received entry from the qualifying draw:
  Sofia Arvidsson
  Marta Domachowska
  Barbora Strýcová
  Elena Vesnina

The following player received entry as a lucky loser:
  Yvonne Meusburger

Withdrawals 
  Jennifer Capriati → replaced by  Marion Bartoli
  Anna-Lena Grönefeld → replaced by  Vera Dushevina
  Justine Henin → replaced by  Iveta Benešová
  Amélie Mauresmo → replaced by  Yvonne Meusburger
  Flavia Pennetta → replaced by  Klára Koukalová
  Mary Pierce → replaced by  Virginie Razzano
  Chanda Rubin → replaced by  Lisa Raymond

Retirements 
  Conchita Martínez (Achilles tendon strain)

Doubles main draw entrants

Seeds 

Rankings are as of 17 October 2005

Other entrants
The following pair received wildcards into the doubles main draw:
  Yvonne Meusburger /  Tamira Paszek

The following pair received entry from the qualifying draw:
  Yuliana Fedak /  Elena Vesnina

Champions

Singles

  Nadia Petrova defeated  Patty Schnyder, 4–6, 6–3, 6–1.
It was Petrova's first WTA singles title.

Doubles

  Gisela Dulko /  Květa Peschke defeated  Conchita Martínez /  Virginia Ruano Pascual, 6–2, 6–3.
It was the 4th title of both Dulko and Peschke's careers, and their only title together as a pair.

References

Generali Ladies Linz
Linz Open
Generali Ladies Linz
Generali Ladies Linz
Gast